Dušan Ivanov (Born 17 February 1991 in Niš) (Serbian Cyrillic: Душан Иванов) is a Serbian footballer.

He started career in FK Radnički Niš. He then moved to FK Jagodina he played just one game. He then moved to Radnički Sombor in Serbian First League, where he played two solid two seasons. In 2011, he returned to FK Radnički Niš.

Honours
 Serbian First League
 Winner (1): 2012

Notes

External links
 
 Dušan Ivanov stats at utakmica.rs 
 

1991 births
Living people
Sportspeople from Niš
Serbian footballers
Association football defenders
Serbian SuperLiga players
FK Radnički Niš players
FK Jagodina players
FK Donji Srem players
Serbian First League players
FK Radnički Sombor players
FK BSK Borča players
FK Sinđelić Beograd players
FK Borac Čačak players
Primeira Liga players
C.D. Nacional players
Liga II players
ACS Poli Timișoara players
Serbian expatriate footballers
Serbian expatriate sportspeople in Portugal
Expatriate footballers in Portugal
Serbian expatriate sportspeople in Slovenia
Expatriate footballers in Slovenia
Serbian expatriate sportspeople in Romania
Expatriate footballers in Romania